Sergey Voytsekhovich (born September 26, 1982) is an Uzbek former swimmer, who specialized in breaststroke events. Voytsekhovich competed only in the men's 200 m breaststroke at the 2000 Summer Olympics in Sydney. He achieved a FINA B-standard entry time of 2:21.98 from the Kazakhstan Open Championships in Almaty. He challenged five other swimmers in heat two, including Kyrgyzstan's Alexander Tkachev, a bronze medalist for former Russian squad at the World Championships. With only one swimmer scratched from his heat, Voytsekhovich closed out the field to last place by almost a 15-second deficit behind winner Tkachev in 2:30.23. Voytsekhovich failed to advance into the semifinals, as he placed forty-sixth overall in the prelims.

References

1982 births
Living people
Uzbekistani male breaststroke swimmers
Olympic swimmers of Uzbekistan
Swimmers at the 2000 Summer Olympics
Sportspeople from Tashkent
20th-century Uzbekistani people
21st-century Uzbekistani people